Operación Triunfo is a Spanish reality television music competition to find new singing talent. The fourth series, also known as Operación Triunfo 2005, was aired on Telecinco then La 1 refused a fourth series, from 30 July 2005 to 13 October 2005, presented by Jesús Vázquez. 

Sergio Rivero was the winner of the series.

Headmaster, judges and presenter
Headmaster: Kike Santander
Judges: Noemí Galera, Augusto Algueró, Javier Llano and Inma Serrano
Presenter: Jesús Vázquez

Contestants

Galas

Results summary
Colour key

References

Operación Triunfo